Shaun Foley (born 29 August 1986 in Sydney, New South Wales, Australia) is an Australian rugby union player and a former member of the National Rugby League's (NRL) Sydney Roosters squad.

Foley played in the Australian Schoolboys Rugby Union team that lost to New Zealand 21-16 in 2004. Foley scored all 16 points for the Australian team.

Foley joined NRL side the Sydney Roosters in 2006, playing 7 games and scoring 6 tries. He scored two tries in the Roosters 40-20 victory over the North Queensland Cowboys. Foley signed with the Roosters until the end of 2008, but suffered from injuries in 2007 and missed most of the 2008 season due to a broken ankle.

After coming off contract in 2008, Foley returned to rugby union with Sydney grade club Randwick, but was called up to the Australian rugby sevens side before his first training session with Randwick.

Notes and references

1986 births
Living people
Australian rugby league players
Australian rugby union players
Australia international rugby sevens players
Sydney Roosters players
Newtown Jets NSW Cup players
Rugby league fullbacks
Male rugby sevens players
Commonwealth Games medallists in rugby sevens
Commonwealth Games silver medallists for Australia
Rugby league players from Sydney
Rugby union players from Sydney
Rugby sevens players at the 2010 Commonwealth Games
Medallists at the 2010 Commonwealth Games